Pifer may refer to:

People
Dan Pifer (born c. 1972), American football coach
Lisa Pifer (born 1967), American bass player and song writer 
Rose Pifer, World Series of Poker champion
Steven Pifer (born 1953), former United States Ambassador to Ukraine

Other
Pifer Mountain, summit in West Virginia